Cannon Street Road was a short-lived railway station in Shadwell, east London, that was on the London and Blackwall Railway (LBR) between Minories and Shadwell stations.

It opened in August 1842 but was closed  December 1848. The reasons for its closure are unclear, but it may have been due to low patronage combined with its close proximity to other stations.

In 1877 a new LBR station called Leman Street was opened slightly to the west of the Cannon Street Road site.

References

Disused railway stations in the London Borough of Tower Hamlets
Railway stations in Great Britain opened in 1842
Railway stations in Great Britain closed in 1848
Former London and Blackwall Railway stations
1842 establishments in England